Megachile itapuae is a species of bee in the family Megachilidae. It was described by Curt Schrottky in 1908.

References

Itapuae
Insects described in 1908